The São Paulo tyrannulet (Phylloscartes paulista) is a species of bird in the family Tyrannidae. It is found in the southern Atlantic Forest. Its natural habitats are subtropical or tropical moist lowland forest and subtropical or tropical moist montane forest. It is threatened by habitat loss.

References

São Paulo tyrannulet
Birds of the Atlantic Forest
Taxa named by Hermann von Ihering
Taxa named by Rodolpho von Ihering
São Paulo tyrannulet
Taxonomy articles created by Polbot